In mathematics, the Markov–Kakutani fixed-point theorem, named after Andrey Markov and Shizuo Kakutani,  states that a commuting family of continuous affine self-mappings of a compact convex subset in a locally convex topological vector space has a common fixed point. This theorem is a key tool in one of the quickest proofs of amenability of abelian groups.

Statement
Let E be a locally convex topological vector space. Let C be a compact convex subset of E. 
Let S be a commuting family of self-mappings T of C which are continuous and affine, i.e.
T(tx +(1 – t)y) = tT(x) + (1 – t)T(y) for t in [0,1] and x, y in C. Then the mappings have a common fixed point in C.

Proof for a single affine self-mapping

Let T be a continuous affine self-mapping of C.

For x in C define other elements of C by

Since C is compact, there is a convergent subnet in C:

To prove that y is a fixed point, it suffices to show that f(Ty) = f(y) for every f in the dual of E.
(The dual separates points by the Hahn-Banach theorem; this is where the assumption of local convexity is used.)

Since C is compact, |f| is bounded on C by a positive constant M. On the other hand

Taking N = Ni and passing to the limit as i goes to infinity, it follows that

Hence

Proof of theorem
The set of fixed points of a single affine mapping T is a non-empty compact convex set CT by the result for a single mapping. The other mappings in the family S commute with T so leave CT invariant. Applying the result for a single mapping successively, it follows that any finite subset of S has a non-empty fixed point set given as the intersection of the compact convex sets CT as T ranges over the subset. From the compactness of C it follows that the set

is non-empty (and compact and convex).

References

Fixed-point theorems